Ramayya Vasthavayya is a 2013 Indian Telugu-language action film written and directed by Harish Shankar. It was produced by Dil Raju and stars N. T. Rama Rao Jr., Shruti Haasan and Samantha Ruth Prabhu. The soundtrack was composed by S. Thaman while the cinematography was handled by Chota K. Naidu. The film released worldwide on 11 October 2013 to mixed reviews from critics who criticized its storyline. The film performed poorly at the box office.

Plot 
The film starts with Musallapadu Nagabhushanam (Mukesh Rishi) arranging his daughter's marriage, but two men (Ajay and Bharani) try to kill him. He manages to escape.

The film shifts to Hyderabad where Nandu (N. T. Rama Rao Jr.), a jovial student, lives with his parents (Tanikella Bharani) and (Pragathi). He falls for Akarsha (Samantha Ruth Prabhu), who gets irritated by him. He gets her college address by his new topper neighbour Asha Jyothi (Vidyullekha Raman) by blackmailing her. As his plan fails, he gets closer to her grandmother Baby Shalini (Rohini Hattangadi). Akarsha slowly starts to fall for him. Four of them leave to Akarsha's sister's marriage, who is revealed to be Nagabhushanam's daughter.

At the wedding, Nagabhushanam is attacked. To save himself, Nagabhushanam asks Nandu for help. Eventually, Nandu kills him, asking him to remember a mysterious girl Ammulu at Adityapuram.

After the murder, Nandu makes sure that no clues are left at the spot. Police officer Avinash (Rao Ramesh), who is investigating the case, finds that Nandu is behind those killings. When Avinash tries to arrest Nandu, he kidnaps Akarsha at gunpoint and escapes the arrest. When she asks him why he murdered her father, he reveals his past. Nandu's real name is Ramu, who felt in love with Ammulu (Shruti Haasan), who lives in a village named Adityapuram and later gains her love too, and his parents and her parents. The unknown killers are Ramu's elder brothers. Their families also accept for their marriage. Nagabhushanam, along with Home Minister Umapathi (Kota Srinivasa Rao) and his son Bhikshapathi (P. Ravi Shankar), plans to grab a land that was very fertile. Bhikshapathi is a womanizer and lusts over Ammulu when she confronts him. When he misbehaves with her, he is attacked by Ramu, which makes them rivals. The trio resort to lot of bloodshed and finally grab the land and share among themselves.

Later, Ammulu and Ramu's marriage is fixed by her parents and Ramu's grandfather Raja Rao Bahadur Ramchandra Naidu (Nagineedu). During the preparations, Nagabhushanam's son Vicky (Bharath Raju) and some more goons attack on Ammulu. Nagabhushanam's son kills Ammulu, and Ramu loses her and his near and dear ones. He migrates to Hyderabad and changes his name to Nandu. He also tells that he had only killed Akarsha's brother and leaves her safely at her home through his friends. Ramu and his brothers killed Nagabhushanam to lure Bhikshapathi out of hiding. In order to seek revenge, through a girl (Hamsa Nandini), Ramu plans to invite Bhikshapathi to a youth fest as the chief guest. Bhikshapathi lusts at her and accepts to attend. There, he sees Ramu and plans to attack him with his henchmen, but he escapes. Later, he informs Bhikshapathi that he kidnapped Umapathi and challenges him to face him at Adityapuram. Ramu  reminds Bhikshapathi about Ammulu's death and kills him with a plough. Umapathi doesn't bear to see this and dies because of heart attack. The film ends with Nandu starting a trust in the name of his mother in the village and Akarsha teaching the children there.

Cast

Production

Development 
Harish Shankar announced his project with N. T. Rama Rao Jr. which was said to be produced by politician Kodali Nani. Due to political differences between them, Dil Raju replaced Kodali Nani as the film's producer on Sri Venkateswara Creations banner. The movie was officially announced by Harish Shankar in July 2012 and revealed that the project would start once N. T. Rama Rao Jr. completes his part for Baadshah. The titles MLA: Manchi Lakshanalu unna Abbai and Jana Gana Mana were speculated as the film's titles which were later ruled out by Dil Raju and said that the movie does not have a title yet. On 18 October 2012 the film's muhurtham and pooja ceremony were held in Dil Raju's office in Hyderabad. Chota K. Naidu and S. Thaman were announced as the cinematographer and music director respectively. Ramesh Reddy and Sathish Vegnesha provided the screenplay while Gautham Raju was selected as the editor.

Casting 
Harish Shankar announced that there would be two female leads in the film and Tamannaah was rumored as one of them. Later Samantha was selected as the main female lead. Meanwhile, it was known that N. T. Rama Rao Jr. would be seen as a college student. Shruti Hassan was selected as the second female lead. Harish planned no combination scenes for both the female leads in this film and forgone his extra remuneration for casting both of them. She later confirmed it to be a special character with less length adding that it was a cameo appearance. P. Ravishankar was selected to play the role of main villain recognizing his fantastic performance in negative roles in Kannada movies. Vidyullekha Raman was selected to play the role of N. T. Rama Rao Jr.'s friend which was said to be a crucial one. Hamsa Nandini was selected for an item number in the film.

Filming 
Principal photography began on 4 January 2013 in Hyderabad. The first schedule lasted for 9 days and ended on 13 January 2013. Shruti Haasan started working on this movie on 26 March 2013 and many vital scenes on herself and N. T. Rama Rao Jr. were shot. In late June, Samantha rejoined the film's sets in Hyderabad after returning from Europe. The film shoot had a night schedule where the scenes were canned till 5:30 AM. Few wedding scenes were shot at Sierra Garden and Friendly Line areas of Ramoji Film City. A song was shot at Annapurna Studios on N. T. Rama Rao Jr. The climax was shot in August 2013 at Hyderabad and 1000 Junior Artists joined the scene. 1 day talkie shoot and 3 songs were left to be shot. Out of 3, 2 songs were planned to shoot in Spain. A song on Hamsa Nandini and N. T. Rama Rao Jr. was shot at Annapoorna Studios on whose completion the filming ended.

Music

Release 
The film was planned for a release on 27 September 2013 to coincide with the 12th anniversary of N. T. Rama Rao Jr.'s first blockbuster Student No.1. It was postponed to 11 October 2013 due to political Disturbances prevailing in the state. The film was awarded an 'A' certificate by Central Board of Film Certification due to some heavy action sequences without any cuts and 1200 screens were locked globally. Lorgan Entertainment distributed the film in Australia. My3 Movies distributed the film in USA. A Malayalam Dubbed Version Named Sarvadhipan was released later.

Marketing 
The film's first look poster was unveiled on 20 April 2013 which also confirmed the film's title. The film's teaser was unveiled on 20 May 2013 to coincide with N. T. Rama Rao Jr.'s birthday. A video teaser of the song "Jabilli Nuvve Cheppamma" was released on 30 August 2014 which became an instant hit receiving 1.2 million views and about 10,000 likes in five days of its release in YouTube. On 17 September 2013 Harish Shankar posted the making video of the song "Neneppudaina Anukunnana" on YouTube and spoke about its filming. The film's theatrical trailer was released on 21 September 2013.

Home Media 
Aditya Videos released the DVD and Blu-ray of the film in India and an online version was uploaded by them in YouTube on 20 February 2014. The film's satellite rights were acquired by Zee Telugu for an undisclosed price. The film's worldwide television premiere happened on 16 March 2014. The film's overseas DVD was released in NTSC format on 21 March 2014 by Bhavani Videos while the Blu-ray Disc released two days later. The film's official online release in YouTube received a tremendous response. It received 1.2 million views in two days and increased day by day, becoming highly successful online.

Reception 
The Times of India wrote "The film is packaged entirely around its hero with NTR looking uber cool and as stylish as ever. He got into the skin of the character and has delivered a fantastic performance to shoulder the film. All in all, Ramayya Vasthavayya's first half is a fun-ride as you see NTR in his elements. However, the second half could be a disappointment." The Hindu wrote "Until a few minutes before the interval, you’re left looking beneath the surface of the comedy, songs and romance to see what the film is trying to communicate to you. And post interval, when the film takes you into a rural hamlet and recalls an ill-fated past followed by revenge, there’s way too much bloodshed that leaves you numb. Watch this film if you are an NTR fan." Sify wrote "Can watch it for its first half and for NTR. Other than that, the movie is just another routine revenge drama that fails to impress" and rated it 2.75/5. IANS called the film "a hero-worshipping, fan-appealing film that gets almost everything in the book of filmmaking wrong" in its review.

123telugu stated "Ramayya Vasthavayya is a stylish mass entertainer that showcases all of NTR’s abilities very well. The superb first half is a big asset. A predictable and below par second half is a slight let down. However, the film should work well at the Box Office and NTR's fans will be a delighted lot" and rated the film 3.25/5. Oneindia Entertainment stated "Ramayya Vasthavayya is purely a mass masala entertainer that will impress all classes of audiences. Junior NTR's acting, Harish [sic] direction, Shruti Haasan's glamour and Thaman's music stand out in the film. It is a brilliant treat from Dil Raju team." IndiaGlitz wrote "In telling an outdated and damn predictable story, Harish Shankar S committed one blunder after another. His only trump card was a romantic NTR, who is seen imitating Dev Anand here and Victory Venkatesh there. A paper-thin storyline is the least of Ramayya's imperfections. Too much violence in the second half rips it of entertainment value" and rated the film 2.75/5.

Box office 
Ramayya Vasthavayya opened to packed houses with 90% to 100% occupancy in single screens and multiplexes. The film stood in the third spot in the list of Telugu cinema with the highest first-day share in Andhra Pradesh with Attarintiki Daredi and Baadshah standing in the first two spots. However the film's collections dropped significantly on its second day except in Guntur, Nellore, Ceded and Karnataka regions while a lukewarm response was observed at the USA box office.

Trade experts opined that the film's business would be closed soon due to the successful run of Attarintiki Daredi.

References

External links 
 

2013 films
2010s Telugu-language films
Films shot in Ooty
2013 masala films
Films directed by Harish Shankar
Films scored by Thaman S
Films shot in Spain
Films shot at Ramoji Film City
Films shot in Hyderabad, India
Sri Venkateswara Creations films